Boulder Hill is a census-designated place (CDP) in Oswego Township, Kendall County, Illinois, United States. Per the 2020 census, the population was 8,394. It is part of the Chicago metropolitan area on the Fox River, south of Aurora.

Geography
Boulder Hill is located at  (41.7113530, -88.3351400).

Up until the early 2000s, the Boulder Hill subdivision had a small development area, equating to almost a town square.  The community itself has a strong identity, as the people from Boulder Hill are not classified as being from Montgomery or Oswego, two nearby larger towns.

Postal service is provided to Boulder Hill via the Montgomery Post Office. While Boulder Hill is unincorporated and not part of the village of Montgomery, there is confusion due to Boulder Hill residents' mailing addresses including "Montgomery" as the designated address. Governmental services provided to Boulder Hill primarily come from either Kendall County or Oswego Township offices.

The community has four churches, a grocery store, a small retail development, a gas station, three schools (two elementary and a middle school), a retirement facility, and the area used to have an automotive dealership. There is  minimal vacant land left for development. The villages of Oswego and Montgomery have both expanded their communities up to the boundaries of Boulder Hill, so there is no room for further business expansion. Other than the Boulder Hill Market, most of the commercial businesses located in Boulder Hill are part of the village of Oswego.

Being unincorporated, Boulder Hill's property taxes have risen in recent years as the various taxing bodies such as the Oswegoland Park District and the Oswego School District have expanded to keep up with the growth of adjacent communities such as Oswego. So while Boulder Hill was previously known for having low property taxes because it does not have its own government, that is no longer the case.

Demographics

2020 census

Note: the US Census treats Hispanic/Latino as an ethnic category. This table excludes Latinos from the racial categories and assigns them to a separate category. Hispanics/Latinos can be of any race.

2000 Census
As of the census of 2000, there were 8,169 people, 2,848 households, and 2,229 families residing in the CDP. The racial makeup of the CDP was 90.68% White, 1.91% African American, 0.38% Native American, 0.66% Asian, 0.01% Pacific Islander, 4.53% from other races, and 1.82% from two or more races. Hispanic or Latino of any race were 9.82% of the population.

There were 2,848 households, out of which 39.9% had children under the age of 18 living with them, 63.5% were married couples living together, 10.7% had a female householder with no husband present, and 21.7% were non-families. 17.7% of all households were made up of individuals, and 7.8% had someone living alone who was 65 years of age or older. The average household size was 2.87 and the average family size was 3.25.

In the CDP, the population was spread out, with 29.1% under the age of 18, 8.3% from 18 to 24, 31.0% from 25 to 44, 22.1% from 45 to 64, and 9.5% who were 65 years of age or older. The median age was 34 years. For every 100 females, there were 96.6 males. For every 100 females age 18 and over, there were 92.6 males.

The median income for a household in the CDP was $60,016, and the median income for a family was $63,481. Males had a median income of $46,134 versus $28,772 for females. The per capita income for the CDP was $21,536. About 1.2% of families and 1.8% of the population were below the poverty line, including 0.9% of those under age 18 and 4.5% of those age 65 or over.

See also
 List of census-designated places in Illinois

References

Census-designated places in Illinois
Census-designated places in Kendall County, Illinois
Unincorporated communities in Illinois